Diego Peláez Silva (born 18 May 1989) is a Spanish professional footballer who plays as an attacking midfielder or winger.

Club career
In 2014, Peláez signed for Cultural Leonesa in the Spanish third division. On 5 October 2014, Peláez scored his first goal for Cultural Leonesa during a 3–1 win over Burgos from the halfway line.

In 2019, he signed for Greek third division club Trikala. 

In 2020, Peláez signed for Managua in Nicaragua.

Before the second half of the 2020–21 season, he signed for Spanish team Lorca Deportiva.

In October 2021, Peláez signed for Hong Kong Premier League club Resources Capital. On 31 October 2021, he debuted for Resources Capital in a 4–0 loss to Southern District. On 29 January 2022, he left the club after featuring in seven games for RCFC, including groups stage of Sapling Cup and the HKPL.

References

External links
 

1989 births
Living people
Footballers from Santiago de Compostela
Spanish footballers
Association football forwards
Céltiga FC players
Pontevedra CF B footballers
Coruxo FC players
SD Compostela footballers
Cultural y Deportiva Leonesa players
Racing de Ferrol footballers
Marbella FC players
CE Sabadell FC footballers
CD Mirandés footballers
UB Conquense footballers
CD Teruel footballers
Trikala F.C. players
Managua F.C. players
CF Lorca Deportiva players
Resources Capital FC players
Segunda División B players
Nicaraguan Primera División players
Hong Kong Premier League players
Spanish expatriate footballers
Spanish expatriate sportspeople in Greece
Spanish expatriate sportspeople in Nicaragua
Spanish expatriate sportspeople in Hong Kong
Expatriate footballers in Greece
Expatriate footballers in Nicaragua
Expatriate footballers in Hong Kong